Encipher Inye 
The Encipher Inye is a tablet PC developed by The Encipher Group.  It was announced on 8 May 2010 and released in Nigeria that same year. It is powered by a Telechips Tcc8902 ARM 11 800Mhz processor and runs on Android version 2.1 a.k.a. Eclair. It was created by Saheed Adepoju, one of the co-founders.

Specifications

Power: 2600 mAh battery

Storage capacity: 16Gb

Memory: 512MB .

Input: Resistive touchscreen.

I/O PORTS: Mic- in, DC-in, 35mm stereo headphone jack, HDMI 1.3, Output 1080P 1xUSB Host 1.1, Highspeed USB OTG 2.0.

Camera: 1.3MP

AUDIO: MP3, WMA, MP2, OGG, AAC, M4A, MA4, FLAC, APE, 3GP, WAV

Video playback: Capable of  HD playback (1080P)

Connectivity: Wifi 802.11 (a/b/g). 3G.

Online services: Android Market.

Name

The name "Inye" means 'The One' in Igala, a language in Nigeria.

See also 
Android

References

External links 
 Enciphergroup.com
 BBC report

Tablet computers
Android (operating system) devices